This is a list of statues and monuments of Leopold II of Belgium (9 April 1835 – 17 December 1909), the second King of the Belgians from 1865 to 1909 and, through his own initiative, the owner and absolute ruler of the Congo Free State from 1885 to 1908.

Statues in Belgium 
Several statues have been erected to honour the legacy of Leopold II in Belgium. According to Professor of Colonial History Idesbald Goddeeris of Leuven University (2018), most of the statues date from the interwar period, the peak of colonial-patriotic propaganda. The monuments were supposed to help get rid of the scandal after international commotion about the atrocities in the Congo Free State during Leopold II's rule, and to raise people's enthusiasm for the colonial enterprise in Belgian Congo.

His controversial regime in the Congo Free State has motivated proposals for these statues to be removed. During the international George Floyd protests against racism (May–July 2020), several statues of Leopold II were vandalised, while several petitions that called for the removal of some or all statues were signed by tens of thousands of Belgians. Other petitions, also signed by tens of thousands, called for the statues to remain.

In early June 2020, a majority in the Brussels Parliament requested a committee to be set up to 'decolonise the public sphere' in the Brussels-Capital Region. From 9 June 2020 onwards, authorities in Belgium gave way to public pressure and began removing some of the statues of Leopold, beginning with ones in Ekeren in the municipality of Antwerp and in the Waracqué Faculty of Economics and Management of the University of Mons on that day. On 30 June 2020, the 60th anniversary of the Democratic Republic of the Congo's independence, King Philippe released a statement expressing his "deepest regret" for the wounds of the colonial past, and the "acts of violence and cruelty committed" in the Congo during colonisation, but did not explicitly mention Leopold's role in the atrocities. Some activists accused him of not making a full apology.

Statues in Congo 

A statue of Leopold II in the DRC's capital Kinshasa (known until 1966 as Leopoldville) was removed after their independence. Congolese culture minister Christophe Muzungu decided to reinstate the statue in 2005. He claims that the beginning of the Free State had been a time of some economic and social progress. He argued that people should recognize some positive aspects of the king as well as the negative, but hours after the six-metre (20ft) statue was installed near Kinshasa's central station, it was officially removed.

Statues in France 
There are two statues of Leopold II in France, both located in Saint-Jean-Cap-Ferrat, a town on the Mediterranean coast in the Alpes-Maritimes department in Southeastern France. Leopold II had bought a lot of real estate in the Cap Ferrat since 1896.

The oldest statue is a bronze medal of Leopold II embedded into a stone pier, erected in 1911. It contains the text 'A / LA MEMOIRE / DU ROI DES BELGES / LEOPOLD II / HOTE DU CAP FERRAT. QUELQUES AMIS / DE LA COTE D AZUR / 1911' ("To the memory of the King of the Belgians, Leopold II, Host of the Cap Ferrat. Some friends from the Côte d'Azur, 1911.").

The youngest is a bust of bronze, posited on a stone pier, crafted by Victor Demanet and erected on 7 February 1951. The pier contains the text "AU ROI / LEOPOLD II / LES VETERANS / DE L'ETAT / INDEPENDANT / DU CONGO. DON / A LA FRANCE ("To King Leopold II. The veterans of the Independent State of the Congo. Given to France."). The Association of Veterans of the Independent State of Congo, founded on 25 October 1928, gifted this monument to France in 1951 to honour Leopold II for their military service in the Congo Free State.

See also 
 George Floyd protests
 Street name controversy

References 

2020 disestablishments in Belgium
Leopold II of Belgium
Monuments and memorials in Belgium
Monuments and memorials removed during the George Floyd protests
Outdoor sculptures in Belgium
Sculptures of men in Belgium
Statues in Belgium
Buildings and structures in the Democratic Republic of the Congo
Vandalized works of art
Black Lives Matter
Leopold